The Irish League in season 1961–62 comprised 12 teams, and Linfield won the championship after a play-off with Portadown.

League standings

Results

Top scorers (including play-off)

References
Northern Ireland - List of final tables (RSSSF)

NIFL Premiership seasons
1961–62 in Northern Ireland association football
Northern